Quantum Signal Processing is a Hamiltonian simulation algorithm with optimal lower bounds in query complexity. It linearizes the operator of a quantum walk using eigenvalue transformation. The quantum walk takes a constant number of queries. So quantum signal processing's cost depends on the constant number of calls to the quantum walk operator, number of single qubit quantum gates that aid in the eigenvalue transformation and an ancilla qubit.

Eigenvalue transformation
Given a unitary , calculate . For example, if , .

Algorithm
 Output: 
 Create an input state 
 Define a controlled-gate, 

References

Quantum information science